Clayfield Copse is a local nature reserve on the northern edge of the suburb of Caversham in Reading, UK. Some of the woodland is being actively managed as hazel coppice, and traditional dead hedging defines some of the ancient woodland areas. The site is the only outcrop of London Clay north of the River Thames in Reading and makes up the southern tip of the Chiltern Hills. The nature reserve is under the management of the Reading Borough Council.

The site also features a sculpture trail.

History

Clayfield Copse used to be part of the country house estate of Caversham Park. In 1991, the site was designated a local nature reserve, making it Reading's first such reserve.

Fauna
The site has the following fauna:

Birds
Picus viridis
Eurasian golden oriole

Flora
The site has the following flora:

Trees

Plants

Fungi
Daldinia concentrica

References

Parks and open spaces in Reading, Berkshire
Nature reserves in Berkshire
Local Nature Reserves in Berkshire